Paul Dalla Lana is a Canadian entrepreneur, philanthropist, and amateur racing driver who is currently driving for Aston Martin Racing in the World Endurance Championship. He is featured in the documentary "The gentleman driver", about non professional drivers.

He is the founder of NorthWest Healthcare Properties Real Estate Investment Trust, which owns and manages medical buildings in Canada. In 2008, he donated CAD $20-million to establish the Dalla Lana School of Public Health at the University of Toronto. In 2018, it was announced he was making an additional $20-million gift to the school.

Racing record

Racing career summary 

† As Dalla Lana was a guest driver, he was ineligible to score championship points.

Complete FIA World Endurance Championship results
(key) (Races in bold indicate pole position) (Races in italics indicate fastest lap)

* Season still in progress.

24 Hours of Le Mans results

Complete WeatherTech SportsCar Championship results
(key) (Races in bold indicate pole position; results in italics indicate fastest lap)

References

Living people
21st-century Canadian businesspeople
21st-century Canadian philanthropists
24 Hours of Daytona drivers
24 Hours of Le Mans drivers
Aston Martin Racing drivers
Audi Sport drivers
Canadian company founders
Canadian racing drivers
FIA World Endurance Championship drivers
Mercedes-AMG Motorsport drivers
W Racing Team drivers
Year of birth missing (living people)

AF Corse drivers
Rolex Sports Car Series drivers
American Le Mans Series drivers
WeatherTech SportsCar Championship drivers
European Le Mans Series drivers